The brimstone moth (Opisthograptis luteolata) is a moth of the family Geometridae. The species was first described by Carl Linnaeus in his 1758 10th edition of Systema Naturae. It should not be confused with the brimstone butterfly Gonepteryx rhamni.

Description
This species is unmistakable within its range, with bright yellow wings marked with small brown patches along the costa of the forewing and a small brown-edged white stigma, also on the forewing. The wingspan is 33–46 mm. "0. luteolata L. The only European species. The name-typical form has on the forewing red-brown costal markings at the base, at the discal mark and triangularly at the apex; faint, irregularly grey antemedian and postmedian lines, interrupted at the veins. Hindwing with dark discal dot and faint grey postmedian line. — aestiva Vorh. & Müll.-Rutz is a smaller, more deeply coloured summer brood form. It seems to be the principal or only form in Tunis. — ab. flavissima Krulik. is almost entirely yellow, only with slight remnants of the costal markings. — ab. albescens Ckll. has the ground colour pure white instead of yellow. Very pale yellow examples have been separated as intermedia Harrison. — ab. niko Chr. is according to. Staudinger an extraordinary aberration with both wings broadly fuscous margined and the basal part of the forewing brownish. Perhaps accidental, as the yellow of this species is highly susceptible to various kinds of chemical action.- provincialis Ob. is a pale, weakly marked form from Provence. — emaculata Graes. lacks the apical patch of the forewing. Prevalent in Central Asia, accidental elsewhere. — mimulina Btlr.  has the cell-mark large, the lines strong, the 2 principal lines of the forewing ending in conspicuous red-brown spots on the hindmargin. N. India: Dharmsala etc."

The moth sometimes flies during the day but mainly at night, and is attracted to light.

The larva is brown or green with a "horn" on its back and feeds on a variety of trees and shrubs. Recorded food plants include apple, birch, blackthorn, currant, hawthorn, Prunus, rowan, Amelanchier and willow. The species, due to its complex life cycle, overwinters either as a larva or a pupa.

Life cycle
The species has a complex ecology: sometimes one brood is produced each year but sometimes three broods are produced over a two-year period, with the result that adults can be seen on the wing at any time from April to October .

Distribution
The brimstone is found throughout the Palearctic region and Western Asia.

Early research
The English zoologist Edward Bagnall Poulton, author of The Colours of Animals (1890) described countershading in insects including the caterpillar larvae of the brimstone moth. The American artist Abbott Handerson Thayer, generally considered the originator of the theory of countershading, credited Poulton with its partial discovery.

Gallery

References

Bibliography
 Chinery, Michael Collins Guide to the Insects of Britain and Western Europe 1986 (Reprinted 1991)
 Skinner, Bernard Colour Identification Guide to Moths of the British Isles 1984

External links

"70.226 BF1906 Brimstone Moth Opisthograptis luteolata (Linnaeus, 1758)". UKMoths. Retrieved April 5, 2019.

"07613 Opisthograptis luteolata (Linnaeus, 1758) - Gelbspanner". Lepiforum e.V. Retrieved April 5, 2019.

Ourapterygini
Moths described in 1758
Moths of Asia
Moths of Europe
Geometrid moths of Great Britain
Taxa named by Carl Linnaeus